Obosomase Waterfalls is located in the Eastern Region of Ghana.  It is 150 meters from the Aburi community.

Location 
The Obosomase waterfalls can be found at the Akuapim North Municipal District of Eastern Region.

Images

References 

Waterfalls of Ghana